Ultima East is a locality located in the 'Lakes' Ward of the Rural City of Swan Hill, Victoria, Australia.

References

Towns in Victoria (Australia)
Rural City of Swan Hill